Jared Warren is an American musician who is the bassist of Big Business (alongside drummer Coady Willis) and formerly the Melvins.

Career 
Both Warren and Willis joined the Melvins in January 2006 and appear on (A) Senile Animal as well as 2008's Nude with Boots and 2010's album The Bride Screamed Murder. Warren had a role as actor in the 2009 horror movie Muckman. Warren was previously a member of bands Karp, Tight Bros from Way Back When, White Shit, and The Whip. He also contributed vocals to the song "Breaking Rocks" on the album Forging Steel and Laying Stone by Akimbo.

In 2020, Warren participated in a long form career spanning interview on Conan Neutron's Protonic Reversal, speaking about the Whip reissues, Big Business, his time with the Melvins and much more.

In September 2022, Sara Lund from Unwound revealed in an interview with Pitchfork that Warren was recruited to play bass on the band's reunion tour, replacing late bassist Vern Rumsey.

Select discography

Karp
1994: Mustaches Wild
1995: Suplex
1997: Self Titled LP

Tight Bros from Way Back When
1999: Running Thru My Bones
2001: Lend You a Hand

Big Business
2005: Head for the Shallow
2007: Here Come the Waterworks
2009: Mind the Drift
2011: Quadruple Single (EP)
2013: Battlefields Forever
2016: Command Your Weather
2019 - The Beast You Are

Melvins
2006: (A) Senile Animal
2008: Nude with Boots
2010: The Bride Screamed Murder
2011: Sugar Daddy Live (live album)
2012: The Bulls & the Bees (EP)
2013: Everybody Loves Sausages (select songs)
2016: Basses Loaded (on the song "Choco Plumbing")

References 

Year of birth missing (living people)
Living people
Musicians from Olympia, Washington
Alternative metal bass guitarists
Guitarists from Washington (state)
American male bass guitarists
Melvins members